The following outline is provided as an overview of and topical guide to environmentalism, broad philosophy, ideology and social movement regarding concerns for environmental conservation and improvement of the health of the environment, particularly as the measure for this health seeks to incorporate the concerns of non-human elements. Environmentalism advocates the preservation, restoration and/or improvement of the natural environment, and may be referred to as a movement to control pollution.

What type of thing is environmentalism? 

Environmentalism can be described as all of the following:
 a philosophy – the study of knowledge and the nature of life
 an environmental philosophy – a branch of philosophy that studies the fundamental workings of human's relation to the environment and our place in it 
 a branch of ethics – environmentalism concerns moral relationships and the intrinsic value of both humans and the environment 
 a branch of environmental ethics –  environmental ethics describes the moral aspects that connect humans and non humans concerning the environment and what obligations human species have to non human species
 Ideology – a system of ideas that focus on environmental thought and form how one thinks about maintaining the environment 
 Political movement – environmentalists seek to both change and create policy concerning environmental issues in order to protect the environment from further harm 
 Social movement – as a collective group environmentalists seek to create social environmental change and protect environmental liberties through both radical and non radical ecological groups

Environmental movement 

 Conservation movement – seeks to protect natural areas for sustainable consumption, as well as traditional (hunting, fishing, trapping) and spiritual use.
 Environmental conservation – process in which one is involved in conserving the natural aspects of the environment. Whether through reforestation, recycling, or pollution control, environmental conservation sustains the natural quality of life.
 Environmental health movement – dates at least to Progressive Era, and focuses on urban standards like clean water, efficient sewage handling, and stable population growth. Environmental health could also deal with nutrition, preventive medicine, aging, and other concerns specific to human well-being. Environmental health is also seen as an indicator for the state of the environment, or an early warning system for what may happen to humans
 Environmental justice – movement that began in the U.S. in the 1980s and seeks an end to environmental racism and prevent low-income and minority communities from an unbalanced exposure to highways, garbage dumps, and factories. The Environmental Justice movement seeks to link "social" and "ecological" environmental concerns, while at the same time preventing de facto racism, and classism. This makes it particularly adequate for the construction of labor-environmental alliances.
 Ecology movement – involves the Gaia theory as well as Value of Earth and other interactions between humans, science, and responsibility.
 Deep ecology – ideological spinoff of the ecology movement that views the diversity and integrity of the planetary ecosystem, in and for itself, as its primary value.
 Bright green environmentalism – currently popular sub-movement that emphasizes the idea that through technology, good design and more thoughtful use of energy and resources, people can live responsible, sustainable lives while enjoying prosperity.
 Anti-nuclear movement – opposes the use of various nuclear technologies.
  Positions
 Nuclear disarmament
 Opposes the use of nuclear power
 Anti-nuclear groups
 Campaign for Nuclear Disarmament
 Friends of the Earth
 Greenpeace
 International Physicians for the Prevention of Nuclear War
 Nuclear Information and Resource Service

Environmental issues 

These topics relate to the anthropogenic effects on the natural environment:
 Climate change
 Global warming
 Global dimming
 Fossil fuels
 Sea level rise
 Greenhouse gas
 Ocean acidification
 Shutdown of thermohaline circulation
 Conservation
 Species extinction
 Pollinator decline
 Coral bleaching
 Holocene extinction
 Invasive species
 Poaching
 Endangered species
 Energy
 Energy conservation
 Renewable energy
 Efficient energy use
 Renewable energy commercialization
 Environmental degradation
Eutrophication
 Habitat destruction
 Invasive species
 Trail ethics
 Environmental health
 Air quality
 Asthma
 Electromagnetic fields
 Electromagnetic radiation and health
 Indoor air quality
 Lead poisoning
 Sick Building Syndrome
 Genetic engineering
 Genetic pollution
 Genetically modified food controversies
 Intensive farming
 Overgrazing
 Irrigation
 Monoculture
 Environmental effects of meat production
 Slash and burn
 Pesticide drift
 Plasticulture
 Land degradation
 Land pollution
 Desertification
 Soil
 Soil conservation
 Soil erosion
 Soil contamination
 Soil salination
 Land use
 Urban sprawl
 Habitat fragmentation
 Habitat destruction
 Nanotechnology
 Nanotoxicology
 Nanopollution
 Nuclear issues 
 Nuclear fallout
 Nuclear meltdown
 Nuclear power
 Nuclear weapons
 Nuclear and radiation accidents
 Nuclear safety
 High-level radioactive waste management.
 Overpopulation
 Burial
 Water crisis
 Overpopulation in companion animals
 Tragedy of the commons
 Ozone depletion
 Chlorofluorocarbons
 Pollution 
 Light pollution
 Noise pollution
 Visual pollution
 Nonpoint source pollution
 Point source pollution
 Water pollution
 Acid rain
 Eutrophication
 Marine pollution
 Ocean dumping
 Oil spills
 Thermal pollution
 Urban runoff
 Water crisis
 Marine debris
 Microplastics
 Ocean acidification
 Ship pollution
 Wastewater
 Fish kill
 Algal bloom
 Mercury in fish
 Air pollution
 Smog
 Tropospheric ozone
 Indoor air quality
 Volatile organic compound
 Airborne particulate matter
 Reservoirs
 Environmental impacts of reservoirs
 Resource depletion
 Exploitation of natural resources
 Overdrafting
 Consumerism
 Consumer capitalism
 Planned obsolescence
 Over-consumption
 Fishing
 Blast fishing
 Bottom trawling
 Cyanide fishing
 Ghost nets
 Illegal, unreported and unregulated fishing
 Overfishing
 Shark finning
 Whaling
 Logging
 Clearcutting
 Deforestation
 Illegal logging
 Mining
 Acid mine drainage
 Hydraulic fracturing
 Mountaintop removal mining
 Slurry impoundments
 Toxins
 Chlorofluorocarbons
 DDT
 Endocrine disruptors
 Dioxin
 Toxic heavy metals
 Herbicides
 Pesticides
 Toxic waste
 PCB
 Bioaccumulation
 Biomagnification
 Waste
 Electronic waste
 Litter
 Waste disposal incidents
 Marine debris
 Medical waste
 Landfill
 Leachate
 Incineration
 Great Pacific Garbage Patch

History of environmentalism 

 History of the anti-nuclear movement (from before 1945)
 History of organic farming (from ancient times)
 History of passive solar building design
 History of sustainability (from the earliest civilizations)
 History of waste management (from ancient times)

History of pollution sources 
 History of coal mining (from ancient times)
 History of the diesel car (from 1933)
 History of electric power transmission (from the late 19th century)
 History of the jet engine
 History of manufactured gas (from the 18th century)
 History of the oil shale industry (from the mid-19th century)
 History of the oil tanker (since 1863?)
 History of rail transport (from nearly 500 years ago)
 History of rapid transit (from 1863)
 History of road transport (from ancient times)
 History of the steam engine (from the first century CE)
 History of steam road vehicles (experimentally from the 17th century)
 History of water fluoridation (from c. 1901, with research on cause Colorado brown stain)

Timelines 
Timeline of history of environmentalism

 Timeline of alcohol fuel
 Timeline of environmental events
 Timeline of environmental history
 Timeline of the New Zealand environment
 Timeline of genetically modified organisms
 Timeline of major U.S. environmental and occupational health regulation
 Timeline of Minamata disease
 Timeline of nuclear weapons development
 Timeline of relief efforts after the 2010 Chile earthquake
 Timeline of relief efforts after the 2010 Haiti earthquake
 Timeline of the Deepwater Horizon oil spill
 Timeline of the Deepwater Horizon oil spill (May 2010)
 Timeline of the Deepwater Horizon oil spill (June 2010)
 Timeline of the Deepwater Horizon oil spill (July 2010)
 Timeline of the Deepwater Horizon oil spill (August 2010)
 Timeline of the Fukushima Daiichi nuclear disaster
 Timeline of the Fukushima Daini nuclear accidents

Environmentalism organizations 
 Environmental organization
 List of conservation organisations
 List of environmental organizations

Environmentalism publications 
 Lists of environmental publications
 List of environmental periodicals
 List of environmental websites
 List of environmental books
 List of environmental reports

See also 

 Environmentalism
 Outline of green politics
 Lists of environmental topics
 Index of conservation articles
 Index of sustainability articles
 List of environmental issues
 List of environmental disasters
 List of environmental organizations

References

External links 

 Environmental history
 Environmental History (scholarly journal)
 Environmentalhistory.org (timeline)
 American Society for Environmental History
 Environmental History Resources
 Historical Topics | About EPA | US EPA
 Environmental-History
 Environmental History on the Internet

 
 
Environmentalism
Environmentalism